Light haulage is a restricted-weight delivery service.

United Kingdom 
In the United Kingdom the maximum permitted gross vehicle weight rating without the need of an operator's license is up to 3.5 tonnes.  Usually light haulage excludes a distribution center as the majority of deliveries are direct.  A delivery may consist of a single, multiple or priority urgent load and can be either same day or next day delivery.

The vehicle (as long as it doesn't exceed the 3.5 T gross vehicle weight) does not require a tachograph and can also be driven by people with a regular car license without the need for an Operator's License.
The speed restriction is higher than heavy goods vehicles: 60 MPH on dual carriageways and up to 70 MPH on motorways.

Postal system of the United Kingdom